is a Japanese television jidaigeki or period drama that was broadcast in 1975.

Plot
The drama depicts in the late Edo period in Nagasaki, Hiramatsu takes up Nagasaki bugyō's  head post. He likes alcohol and women. Furthermore He is always willing to accept a bribe from villains so they consider it is easy to manipulate him. But he is just pretending to be idiot and he kills villains who escape justice despite their crimes.

Cast
 Yorozuya Kinnosuke: Hiramatsu Chūshirō
 Kunie Tanaka: Dr.Kogure Ryojun
 Shōhei Hino: Sanji
 Midori Hagimura : Ogin
 Miki Sugimoto : Ofumi
 Katsutoshi Arata : Kada
Keiji Takamine : Inomata Yasubei
 Shinsuke Mikimoto : Mishima Yogorō
 Hiroyuki Ota : Sawada Kazuma

References

1975 Japanese television series debuts
1970s drama television series
Jidaigeki television series